Vitalis Musungwa Gava Zvinavashe (27 September 1943 – 10 March 2009) was a Zimbabwean general officer, politician and the first commander of the Zimbabwe Defence Forces "ZDF". Zvinavashe had modest academic credentials but was renowned among Zimbabwe’s military circles as a strategist.

Military career
He joined the Rhodesian Bush War in 1967 and went for military training in Chunya Camp in Tanzania in 1968.

In 1977, he was elected as a ZANU-PF Central Committee member and deputy chief of national security and intelligence.

He was appointed commander of Three Brigade in Mutare at independence in 1980 before becoming the country’s first Zimbabwe Defence Forces (ZDF) commander in July 1994 assuming overall command over the army and the Air Force under a new military structure. He oversaw various peacekeeping missions in the Southern African Development Community (SADC) region.

In the Second Congo War, he was in charge of the SADC allied task force troops led by Zimbabwe which fought rebels backed by Uganda and Rwanda to topple the now slain DRC leader Laurent Kabila. The deployment of the Zimbabwean troops later led to the allegations of plunder of natural resources, especially diamonds, in which Zvinavashe was implicated.

Following his retirement in December 2003, General Constantino Chiwenga succeeded him to the post.

He was placed on the European Union and United States sanctions lists in 2003 and remained on the lists until his death.

Post-retirement and death
In the 2008 parliamentary election, he ran on the ZANU-PF ticket for the Gutu district in the Senate, but lost to Empire Makamure of the MDC. He told other ZANU-PF candidates on April 23 that they needed to "accept the reality" that the MDC had won, and he stressed that the importance of preserving peace. He blamed Mugabe for the ZANU-PF candidates' defeat, saying that the people of Masvingo had rejected Mugabe and that the parliamentary candidates suffered as collateral damage.

He had just returned from Cuba where he had gone to seek medical assistance for liver cancer when he died at Manyame Air Base hospital on March 10, 2009. He is survived by his wife Margaret and 12 children.

References

Zimbabwean generals
Zimbabwe African National Liberation Army personnel
2009 deaths
1943 births
Deaths from liver cancer